Cattaraugus County-Olean Airport  is a city-owned, public-use airport located 10 nautical miles (12 mi, 19 km) north of the central business district of Olean, a city in Cattaraugus County, New York, United States. It is included in the National Plan of Integrated Airport Systems for 2011–2015, which categorized it as a general aviation facility.

Facilities and aircraft 
Cattaraugus County-Olean Airport covers an area of 426 acres (172 ha) at an elevation of 2,135 feet (651 m) above mean sea level. It has two runways: 4/22 is 4,800 by 100 feet (1,463 x 30 m) with an asphalt surface; 16/34 is 2,135 by 100 feet (651 x 30 m) with a turf surface.

For the 12-month period ending July 9, 2009, the airport had 25,550 aircraft operations, an average of 70 per day: 98% general aviation, 2% air taxi, and <1% military. At that time there were 12 aircraft based at this airport: 92% single-engine and 8% multi-engine.

Olean has had airline service in the past, including local service carrier Mohawk Airlines. In 1968, Mohawk served Olean 2 flights a day using Fairchild FH 227 equipment. One flight went to Jamestown, NY, continuing on to Cleveland and the other flight went to Syracuse.

References

External links 
 Cattaraugus County-Olean Municipal Airport at City of Olean website
  at New York State DOT Airport Directory
 Aerial image as of April 1994 from USGS The National Map
 

Airports in New York (state)
Transportation buildings and structures in Cattaraugus County, New York